Gaviria is a surname. Notable people with the surname include:

Alejandro Gaviria Uribe (born 1966), Colombian economist and politician
Alfonso Araújo Gaviria (1902–1961), Colombian lawyer and diplomat
Aníbal Gaviria Correa (born 1966), Colombian politician
Carlos Gaviria Díaz (1937–2015), Colombian lawyer and politician
César Gaviria Trujillo (born 1947), Former President of Colombia
Iván Duque Gaviria (1955–2019), Colombian prisoner and former paramilitary leader
Fernando Gaviria Rendon, (born 1994), Colombian professional road and track racing cyclist
Guillermo Gaviria Correa (1962–2003), Colombian politician
Hermán Gaviria Carvajal (1969–2002), Colombian footballer
Inés Gaviria (born 1979), Colombian singer-songwriter
Juliana Gaviria Rendon (born 1991), Colombian Olympic cyclist
Julio Edgar Gaviria Arenas (1945–2009), Colombian footballer
Margarita Vargas Gaviria (born 1971), Colombian singer
Pablo Escobar Gaviria (1949–1993), Colombian drug lord and narcoterrorist
Robeiro Moreno Gaviria (born 1969), Colombian footballer
Simón Gaviria Muñoz (born 1980), Colombian economist and politician
Víctor Gaviria González (born 1955), Colombian film director

See also
Gabiria, town and municipality in Gipuzkoa, Basque Country, Spain
César Gaviria Trujillo Viaduct, cable-stayed bridge connecting the neighbouring cities of Pereira and Dosquebradas in Risaralda, Colombia